Doniphan is a village in Hall County, Nebraska, United States. The population was 829 at the 2010 census. It is part of the Grand Island, Nebraska Micropolitan Statistical Area.

History
The town of Doniphan was platted by local pioneer William J. Burger in 1879 as a midway point between Hastings and Grand Island on the St. Joseph and Grand Island Railroad. It was named for Col. John Doniphan of Saint Joseph, Missouri, an attorney for the railroad.

Doniphan was incorporated as a village in 1884.

Education 
Doniphan Trumbull School is the only school local to the Doniphan Region. Doniphan Trumbull School is a public school located in Doniphan. The local school teaches 222 students in grades 7-12, with a student-teacher ratio of 11 to 1.

Geography
Doniphan is located at  (40.773548, -98.371513).

Demographics

2010 census
As of the census of 2010, there were 829 people, 338 households, and 217 families residing in the village. The racial makeup of the village was 95.8% White, 0.1% African American, 1.1% Native American, 2.3% from other races, and 0.7% from two or more races. Hispanic or Latino of any race were 4.3% of the population.

There were 338 households, of which 36.4% had children under the age of 18 living with them, 51.2% were married couples living together, 9.2% had a female householder with no husband present, 3.8% had a male householder with no wife present, and 35.8% were non-families. 31.7% of all households were made up of individuals, and 16% had someone living alone who was 65 years of age or older. The average household size was 2.45 and the average family size was 3.12.

The median age in the village was 34 years. 28.5% of residents were under the age of 18; 10.4% were between the ages of 18 and 24; 25.6% were from 25 to 44; 23.4% were from 45 to 64; and 12.2% were 65 years of age or older. The gender makeup of the village was 50.2% male and 49.8% female.

2000 census
As of the census of 2000, there were 763 people, 288 households, and 213 families residing in the village. The population density was 1,654.6 people per square mile (640.4/km2). There were 300 housing units at an average density of 650.6 per square mile (251.8/km2). The racial makeup of the village was 98.43% White, 0.39% Native American, 0.26% from other races, and 0.92% from two or more races. Hispanic or Latino of any race were 2.36% of the population.

There were 288 households, out of which 41.7% had children under the age of 18 living with them, 55.2% were married couples living together, 15.3% had a female householder with no husband present, and 26.0% were non-families. 24.0% of all households were made up of individuals, and 8.7% had someone living alone who was 65 years of age or older. The average household size was 2.58 and the average family size was 3.01.

In the village, the population was spread out, with 30.7% under the age of 18, 8.1% from 18 to 24, 29.2% from 25 to 44, 19.1% from 45 to 64, and 12.8% who were 65 years of age or older. The median age was 35 years. For every 100 females, there were 85.2 males. For every 100 females age 18 and over, there were 77.5 males.

As of 2000 the median income for a household in the village was $36,985, and the median income for a family was $42,917. Males had a median income of $30,588 versus $19,904 for females. The per capita income for the village was $15,641. About 9.9% of families and 10.2% of the population were below the poverty line, including 12.1% of those under age 18 and 8.4% of those age 65 or over.

References

External links
 

Villages in Hall County, Nebraska
Villages in Nebraska
Grand Island micropolitan area